Lúčka is a village and municipality in the Rožňava District in the Košice Region of middle-eastern Slovakia.

History
In historical records the village was first mentioned in 1405.

Hussite remains
In Lúčka you find the ruins of a church established by Hussites who left Bohemia during the religious conflicts of the fifteenth century and finally settled here.

The church is oriented north-west, towards Prague, and though deconsecrated is still the site of an annual ceremony to mark Hus's burning at the stake (an event commemorated by the well-known statue of Hus in Prague's Old Town Square).

The Hussites' influence remains in other ways. The division between the villagers who converted to Protestantism under their influence and those who later converted back to Catholicism is still visible in the design of the houses: the houses of Protestants have a cup carved into their wooden eaves; Catholics' houses have a cross. Until recent times, Catholic graves were oriented south, while Protestants faced north.

Geography
The village lies at an altitude of 540 metres and covers an area of 14.937 km².
It has a population of about 211 people.

External links
 Lúčka
https://web.archive.org/web/20070513023228/http://www.statistics.sk/mosmis/eng/run.html
 Spectacular Slovakia travelguide - Lúčka: Outpost of rebellion

Villages and municipalities in Rožňava District